Pan Entertainment is a Korean drama production company. It was established on April 3, 1998 under the name HS Media Co., Ltd.. Its main office, called The PAN, is located in Seoul's Mapo District.

The company's slogan is A world of magical contents.

List of works

Subsidiaries

Pan Stars Company
Pan Stars Company is an artist management agency owned by Pan Entertainment.

Artists
 Ryu Jin
 Tak Jae-hoon
 Kim Yoon-seo
 Ha Joo-hee
 Choi Sung-jae
 Pyo Ye-jin
 Lee In-ha
 Jeon Ye-seul
 Jung Ji-oh
 Park Joo-hyun

References

External links
  

South Korean companies established in 1998
Companies established in 1998
Television production companies of South Korea
Companies based in Seoul
Companies listed on KOSDAQ